"What Chu Want" is a Pop-R&B song performed by American-Australian urban artist J-Wess featuring  Kulaia, Lolly and MC Digga. The single was released in late-2003 as the second single from his debut album, J-Wess Presents Tha LP (2004). "What Chu Want" debuted at number twenty-five on the Australian ARIA Singles Chart, and eventually peaked at number ten, becoming J-Wess' first top ten single. Subsequently, it spent a total of twenty-two weeks on the chart and was certified gold by ARIA for sales in excess of 35,000 copies. It is J-Wess' most successful single. In the New Zealand, "What chu want" peaked at number thirty-four on the RIANZ Singles Chart, becoming J-Wess' second single to peak within the top forty, and his highest single there also.

Track listing 
What Chu Want (Radio Edit) 3:47
What Chu Want (Club Mix) 4:05
What Chu Want (Art Of Sound Remix) 3:25
What Chu Want (Weapon X Remix)  3:33
What Chu Want (Agent 86 Remix) 5:39
What Chu Want (Elite Fleet Remix) 3:58
What Chu Want (Damion Remix) 3:56

Charts

Weekly charts

Year-end charts

References

2003 singles
2003 songs
Mushroom Records singles